Hemigrammus elegans is a species of freshwater fish in the family Characidae native to South America. The type locality is Óbidos, Amazon River, Brazil.

References 

Characidae
Freshwater fish of South America
Freshwater fish of Colombia
Taxa named by Franz Steindachner
Fish described in 1882